The Love Mart is a 1927 American silent drama film directed by George Fitzmaurice starring Billie Dove, Gilbert Roland and Noah Beery, and featuring Boris Karloff. The film is lost.

Cast
 Billie Dove as Antoinette Frobelle
 Gilbert Roland as Victor Jallot
 Ray Turner as Poupet (as Raymond Turner)
 Noah Beery as Captain Remy
 Armand Kaliz as Jean Delicado
 Emile Chautard as Louis Frobelle
 Boris Karloff as Fleming
 Mattie Peters as Caresse
 George Bunny
 Richard Cramer
 Paul Vincenti
 Oliver Eckhardt as Comedy Bailiff

Production
This film had the original title of Louisiana, as surviving publicity materials indicate; it was First National Pictures' production #103.

Survival status
No copies of The Love Mart are currently known to exist. However, the Library of Congress has preserved some footage related to the production featuring Billie Dove. The purpose of the footage appears to have been to test some of Dove's hairstyles for the film. Still frames taken from this 'Hair Test' were posted on internet forums in February 2012.

See also
 Boris Karloff filmography

References

External links

Stills at silentfilmstillarchive.com

1927 films
1927 lost films
1927 romantic drama films
American romantic drama films
American silent feature films
American black-and-white films
Films about American slavery
Films directed by George Fitzmaurice
Films set in New Orleans
Films set in the 1800s
Films about race and ethnicity
Lost American films
1920s English-language films
1920s American films
Silent romantic drama films
Silent American drama films